Brandal is a village in Hareid Municipality in Møre og Romsdal county, Norway. It is located on the eastern shores of the island of Hareidlandet, along the Sulafjorden.

Seal hunting
Brandal was historically known as the home of seal hunters, which had annual hunting trips to the White Sea from 1898 until 1939, and to West Ice and Newfoundland from 1939 until 1982. A pioneer in seal hunting was captain and shipowner Peter S. Brandal. The Museum Aarvak (founded in 1981) is located in Brandal. On the grounds of the museum stands the monument , made by Bjørn Tore Skjølsvik and was unveiled on 18 June 2005.

References

Villages in Møre og Romsdal
Hareid